Elba is a city in and the county seat of Coffee County, Alabama, United States. It is the official seat, although there are two county courthouses, with the other one being located in the town of Enterprise. At the time of the 2010 U.S. census, Elba's population was 3,940. Elba is part of the Enterprise micropolitan statistical area.

History
The town which eventually became Elba originated near a ferry across the Pea River in the early 1830s. Originally called Bridgeville, a U.S. post office was established in the town by 1841. In 1851, a lottery to determine a new name for the town was held. One citizen had been reading a biography of Napoleon Bonaparte, and his suggestion of "Elba" as its name was the winner when it was drawn from a hat before any of the other suggestions. Elba became the county seat of Coffee County in 1852.

A logging railroad first reached Elba on March 20, 1892, with the first permanent rail line arriving in October 1898. The "Dorsey Trailer Company" was constructed at the end of this railroad line, and this company manufactured the highway trailers that served on railroads and highways starting with the piggyback railroad or containerized cargo boom of the second half of the 20th century. The new railroad line ended in West Elba, where the "New Town" industrial section of the town was located. The Seaboard System Railroad ceased all railroad service to Elba, including freight service, on November 27, 1984.

The Pea River is an essential component of the history of Elba. The river was originally called the Talakatchee River by the Creek Indians. (In the Creek language, talak means "pea", and hatchee means "small river".) The Pea River frequently flooded, causing great damage to the town. The Lincoln flood of 1865, named for the assassination of Abraham Lincoln in the same year, was the first to destroy the town. Another devastating flood occurred in 1929 when the river crested at a depth of  early on March 15. Airplanes were used to drop supplies to the completely inundated town. There was only one death from the flood, an African-American man named "Phoe" Larkins. A child born at the Elba Hotel during this flood was named "Noah Tucker" after the biblical character Noah. Vivian Harper received the Theodore N. Vail Silver Medal for her heroic actions during the flood.

A levee was built around the town in 1930. Flood gates were erected and drainage systems improved. Floods continued, however, with especially severe inundations in 1938, 1959 and 1975. The levee broke and Whitewater Creek overflowed into the town. Elba was completely flooded for four days, and the town was nearly destroyed. More floods struck Elba in 1994 and 1998.

Geography
Elba is located in western Coffee County at  (31.417263, -86.077442).

U.S. Route 84 runs from west to east as a northern bypass of the city, leading east  to New Brockton and southwest  to Opp. Many state highways run through the city as well, namely Alabama State Routes 87, 125, 189, and 203. AL-203 forms the western bypass of the city. AL-87 runs from south to north through the center of the city, leading north  to Troy and south  to Samson. AL-189 runs to the west of the city from south to north, leading northwest  to U.S. Route 331 near Brantley and southwest  to Kinston. AL-125 runs northeast from the city  to the community of Victoria.

Elba is located beside the banks of the Pea River.

Climate
The climate in this area is characterized by hot, humid summers and generally mild to cool winters. According to the Köppen Climate Classification system, Elba has a humid subtropical climate, abbreviated "Cfa" on climate maps.

Demographics

2020 census

As of the 2020 United States census, there were 3,508 people, 1,427 households, and 917 families residing in the city.

2010 census
As of the census of 2010, there were 3,940 people, 1,547 households, and 991 families residing in the city. The racial makeup of the city was 62.1% White, 34.3% Black or African American, 1.2% Native American, 0.3% Asian, 0.2% Pacific Islander, 0.8% from other races, and 1.2% from two or more races. 1.1% of the population were Hispanic or Latino of any race.

There were 1,547 households, out of which 25.3% had children under the age of 18 living with them, 39.9% were married couples living together, 19.8% had a female householder with no husband present, and 35.9% were non-families. 32.6% of all households were made up of individuals, and 15.5% had someone living alone who was 65 years of age or older. The average household size was 2.34 and the average family size was 2.97.

In the city, the population was spread out, with 22.0% under the age of 18, 8.1% from 18 to 24, 24.9% from 25 to 44, 25.4% from 45 to 64, and 19.6% who were 65 years of age or older. The median age was 40.9 years. For every 100 females, there were 98.0 males. For every 100 females age 18 and over, there were 110.9 males.

The median income for a household in the city was $28,975, and the median income for a family was $32,065. Males had a median income of $31,652 versus $21,786 for females. The per capita income for the city was $14,878. About 27.6% of families and 27.1% of the population were below the poverty line, including 40.4% of those under age 18 and 17.8% of those age 65 or over.

Education
Public education is provided by the Elba City Public School District. There are two schools in the city:
Elba High School (grades 7 through 12)
Elba Elementary School (grades K through 6)

Media
Radio stations
WELB 1350 AM  (Classic Country and Southern Gospel)
WZTZ 101.1 FM (Sports)

Notable people
Robert D. Bullard, "Father of Environmental Justice"; Dean, School of Public Affairs, Texas Southern University
Alpheus Ellis, Florida Banker and Philanthropist
James E. "Big Jim" Folsom, only Coffee County native to become governor of Alabama
Troy King, Alabama Attorney General from 2004 to 2011
Ronald McKinnon, National Football League player
Cornelia Ellis Wallace, the second wife of Governor George C. Wallace, Jr., and the First Lady of Alabama from 1971 to 1978

References

External links
City of Elba official website
Elba City Schools

Cities in Alabama
Populated places established in the 1830s
Cities in Coffee County, Alabama
County seats in Alabama
Enterprise–Ozark micropolitan area
Populated places established in 1853
1853 establishments in Alabama